Erwin Reimer (29 May 1914 – 23 April 1997) was a Chilean athlete. He competed in the men's decathlon at the 1936 Summer Olympics.

References

1914 births
1997 deaths
Athletes (track and field) at the 1936 Summer Olympics
Chilean decathletes
Olympic athletes of Chile
Place of birth missing